Gavmareh (also Romanized as Gāvmareh; also known as Gāmmareh) is a village in Jalalvand Rural District, Firuzabad District, Kermanshah County, Kermanshah Province, Iran. At the 2006 census, its population was 108, in 23 families.

References 

Populated places in Kermanshah County